Alexander Benson (1872 - November 8, 1947) was an American diplomat.

Biography
He was born in 1872. Having served as Secretary of Legation to Bolivia, he was appointed Second Secretary of the Embassy of the United States at St. Petersburg, Russia in 1911.  In 1913, as Second Secretary, he was put in charge of the Embassy of the United States in Rome. He died on November 9, 1947.

References

1872 births
1947 deaths
American diplomats